Lodewijk Freidrich Paulus (born 27 July 1957) is an Indonesian politician and a retired Lieutenant General who is currently a Deputy Speaker of the People's Representative Council.

References

Members of the People's Representative Council
Golkar politicians
1957 births
Living people
People from Manado